Dawei Township is a township of Dawei District in the Taninthayi Division of Myanmar. The principal town is Dawei.

Demographics

2014

The 2014 Myanmar Census reported that Dawei Township had a population of 125,605. The population density was 29.4 people per km2. The census reported that the median age was 28.5 years, and a sex ratio of 92 males per 100 females. There were 45,753 households; the mean household size was 4.6.

Attractions
Shwedaungza Pagoda, Peinnetaw Ward
Shin Mokhti Buddha, Shin Mokhti Village
Shinbinkayu Pagoda, Kanyon Ward
Shin-u-aw Pagoda, Peinnetaw Ward
Shindatwe Pagoda, Maungmeshaung Village
Shwethalyaung Buddha, Kanaingda Village

References

Townships of Taninthayi Region